Epiperipatus lewisi is a species of velvet worm in the Peripatidae family. This species varies from grey to dark reddish brown on its dorsal surface and has 34 to 36 pairs of legs. The type locality is in Jamaica.

References

Onychophorans of tropical America
Onychophoran species
Animals described in 1961